Majida El Roumi Baradhy (born 13 December 1956) is a Lebanese soprano singer and United Nations Goodwill Ambassador.

Early life 
Majida El Roumi Al Baradhy was born on 13 December 1956 in Kfarshima. Her father, Halim El Roumi, was from a Melkite Christian family from Tyre, South Lebanon, and her mother was Egyptian. Her father was born in Tyre in 1919 but later moved to Haifa, Palestine, at the age of two with his whole family to avoid the hardships of World War I. Kfarshima is also home to many Lebanese singers, musicians and poets like Philimon Wehbe, Melhem Barakat and Issam Rajji. The El Roumi residence was a meeting place for many cultural figures as he worked with many singers. He is accredited with having discovered many well-known artists, mainly the Lebanese star Fairuz.

Majida was featured in her school's stage in Saint Coeur, Al Hadath. At the age of 14, she accompanied her father in an interview on Télé Liban with Najib Hankash, where she first performed songs for Umm Kulthum and Fairuz. At the age of 16, Raymond Safadi, Majida's cousin, noticed her musical capabilities and thought that she should pursue singing as a profession. She participated in the talent show Studio El Fan in 1974 after she sneaked out of the house with her brother and her cousins. For her first appearance on television, she performed for Layla Murad and Asmahan and won the gold medal for oriental singing.

Her success prompted her father to change his mind and give her his blessings to pursue in singing as long as she continued her higher education. Later on, Majida graduated from the Lebanese University after receiving her BA in Arabic Literature. In 1975, Majida released her first single "Am Behlamak" (I'm dreaming of you, Lebanon) with collaboration with the Lebanese poet Said Akl and musician Elias Rahbani. The song, released at the outbreak of the Lebanese Civil War in April 1975, was very popular.

After releasing her first album Wadaa (Farewell) in 1976, Majida got the attention of Egyptian filmmaker Youssef Chahine. She starred alongside Hisham Saleem in her first and only movie Awdat Al Ibn Al Dal (The Return of the Prodigal Son) and performed three of the soundtrack's songs.

Personal life 
She married Antoine Dafone, and after years of marriage she separated from him following rumors about his relationship with a young singer. She has two daughters, Hala and Noor.

Musical career

1970s
In 1974, she was a contestant in the talent show Studio El Fan on Télé Liban and performed songs by Asmahan and Layla Murad at the age of 16.

1980s–1990s 

When she performed at Hunter College in May 1989 accompanied by a 19-piece orchestra, music reviewer Peter Watrous said: "she wandered between near-European pop and Middle Eastern pop".

2001–2004 

In 2001, Majida El Roumi released a single titled "Nachid El Hobb" (The Hymn of Love) with lyrics from Dam'a wa Ibtisama (A Tear and A Smile) written by the Lebanese artist and writer Gibran Khalil Gibran. El Roumi chose this text after the UN ceremony in 2001, when she was named Goodwill Ambassador, and declared it to be the theme message for her mission of peace around the world. In 2001, Majida's sister Maha had to be transported to the USA for better medical care, as she was suffering from cancer.

2011–present 

Majida wrote the lyrics of "Bokra" (Tomorrow), a charity opérette that was released on 11 November 2011. The single's proceeds were donated to various charitable initiatives with arts and culture programs aiming to raise funds for education projects in the Arab World. In an interview with Rima Maktabi in the CNN program – Inside the Middle East, Majida told the story of the new song which was produced by Quincy Jones and RedOne.
In a surprising and unexpected decision, Majida announced that she had pulled herself out of the project. She said that the producer, Quincy Jones, did not meet her conditions and the team supervising and overlooking the project was not professional. Majida already put her voice on the operate, but when they asked her to record again in Qatar, she announced her withdrawal and waived her authorship rights when she backed out of the project.

"Ghazal" 

Majida released her new album "Ghazal" on 22 June 2012 having worked on it for 6 years with many composers and poets.

"Biladi Ana" (My Country) is a duet between Majida and Senegalese singer Youssou N'Dour. Arabic lyrics are taken from Cadmus, Said Akl's theater play and French lyrics are freely inspired from the same theater play by Lebanese novelist Alexandre Najjar. Musical composition is accomplished by Joseph Khalifeh and Jean-Marie Riachi. This song describes Lebanon "the peace", "the beauty", "the creativity" and encourages fraternity, unity between people worldwide and calls for loving each other by surpassing all human differences. Majida and Youssou N'Dour have already performed it during the VIe annual Jeux de la Francophonie in 2009, hosted in Camille Chamoun Sports City Stadium in Beirut accompanied with more than 150 dancers.

"Nour Men Nour" 

Nour Men Nour (A Light from Light) is the fourteenth studio album by Majida released in December 2013 produced by V. Productions. The album explores 12 Christmas carols exploring a wide set of musical genres including classical music and Opera preserving the same musical track that Majida had sung over the years.

The Album peaked the top of the music charts in Virgin Megastores in Lebanon from the day of its release for several consecutive weeks.

Nour Men Nour was promoted majorly online and on Lebanese radio stations by two singles, Sahrit Eid and Min lli Tall, as well as a teaser on Majida's official Facebook page. Majida also filmed a Christmas special episode aired on Christmas Eve on MTV Lebanon which included a live recital from Collège du Sacré-Cœur catholic cathedral in Gemayzeh, Downtown Beirut, and scenes from a visit she had to "Mission De Vie" charity center. As Majida stated, Christmas is an occasion to celebrate as a one big Arabic family, while she added that all sales income and profits went to charity to encourage the spirit of sharing in the Arab World during the unstable periods.

Performances 

Majida graced the Paris Olympia stage twice, the first time in 1993 and the second time in 1998, sponsored by the Lebanese First Lady at that time, Mrs. Mona Herawi, Palais des Congrès de Paris in 1987, Palais des festivals et des congrès de Cannes, Salle Gaveau, the opening of Damascus Opera House in 2004, Athens Concert Hall in Greece and the Royal Albert Hall in London which knew a huge success and was the first sold out concert after The Beatles' concert in 1965. Also, later in the 90s, Majida welcomed Shirley Bassey in the presidential palace in Lebanon for a private concert, she opened in one song before giving Shirley the stage whose orchestra members stood up, astonished by Majida's spectacular soprano performance.

Majida has also performed at Avery Fisher Hall in Lincoln Center, Carnegie Hall and Hunter College in New York City as well as the Place des Arts in Montreal, Quebec, Canada in November 2003 attended by more than 3000 people with incredible standing ovations, then headed to Côte d'Ivoire in 2003 for two concerts which proceeds were returned as benefits to civil war orphans. The concert was attended by the country's president and First Lady. In 2007, Majida toured the US and performed in Fox Theatre (Detroit, Michigan) and the tour included nights in Paris Hotel in Las Vegas.

Majida was also part of the annual Mawazine Festival in Morocco in June 2010, and Jounieh International Festivals on 25 June 2011. She also held a concert in Royal Opera House of Muscat in Shati Al-Qurm district in Oman in November 2011.

In December 2006, Majida performed "Light The Way", a duet with the international opera star, the tenor José Carreras at the 2006 Asian Games opening ceremony in its 15th edition in Doha. In 2009, she performed "Nous sommes les amis du monde", a duet with Senegal artist Youssou N'dour, on the inauguration of the "Jeux Olympiques de la Francophonie" in Beirut, Lebanon.

Majida had a special TV appearance in Christmas time during a recital hosted in the Lebanese Presidential Palace. President Michel Sulaiman and First Lady Wafaa hosted many public figures, politicians and artists in this occasion. The recital was broadcast live on the Lebanese Broadcasting Corporation.

Majida El Roumi's concerts included a tour in the Arab world in 2012–2013; she was part of the Batroun International Festival 2012  and hosted a concert in the amphitheatre of the Katara Cultural Village, Doha. The summer of 2013 was very active with Majida's sold out concerts. After her concert is Megarama Centre in Casablanca, Morocco, she was part of the 49th edition of Carthage Music Festival; she worked for the first time with the Tunisian Symphony Orchestra. It was a one of a kind concert for her in Carthage and M. Mourad Saqli, president of the festival confirmed that Majida's night ranks first in terms of income among the whole performances. She also visited Chokri Belaid's shrine to pray for this person who gave for his country so much, and "Ben Saadoun" children hospital checking up how could their hard cases be treated and taken care of, after hosting a press conference explaining how exceptional this visit is.
Following her continuous success, concerts in Morocco were more demanded that she was part of the 9th edition of Twiza Festival in Tangier. and Timitar Music Testival in Agadir in its 10th year. Her visit to Tanger also included a visit to the children's orphan hospital in "Al Qortobi" center and give the kids some presents. Majida opened the Bahrain Summer Festival in August 2013, too; a full house concert with a wonderful performance with songs for love and peace on the Bahrain National Theater.

The Batroun International Festivals in Lebanon won Majida over one more time for another performance for the end of August in 2013.
The country's political situation was unstable as her concert followed two consecutive explosions in Beirut suburbs. People attended the sold out concert leaving with moments filled with Majida's voice. It was also the only concert ever that Majida sang "Kalimat" twice with historical standing ovations between each and every song of the program.
Majida's first concert in 2014 and after 40 years of her career debut was for the closing season of Dubai Classics in February, it was held in Dubai World Trade Center. The festival opening was with international artist Sarah Brightman performing her Dreamchaser World Tour. Majida broke her 8 years of absence and went back to Egypt for a concert in March on the stage of Bibliotheca Alexandrina in Alexandria. Although Majida's Alexandria concert tickets were criticised for being overpriced, the event sold-out and was (as expected) a raging success. She opened her concert by a mix of both the Egyptian and Lebanese national anthem then sang most of her oldies and hits . In her press conference a day before the concert, Majida affirmed that the aim of this visit was just to encourage the tourism in Egypt after the crises the country has been through. She also pointed out she has nothing but respect for the June 2013 Egyptian protests emphasizing that she has no political intentions whatsoever. At the end of the concert, the mayor of Alexandria, Mr. Tarek Mahdi gave majida the golden key of the city in the presence of the minister of tourism in Egypt Mr. Hicham Zaazouh. A Day after her concert, Majida spent a touristic tour in the city and visitied Montaza Palace where she planted in its garden the first Lebanese Cedar since King Farouk's era, she also cried over Youssef Chahine's tomb as a loyal memory for the maker of her first movie.

In September 2021 Majida El Roumi fainted on stage while performing at Jordan's Jerash Festival, she returned minutes later to complete her set during the event's opening night.

Public positions 

Majida El Roumi was appointed an ambassador for the United Nations' Food and Agriculture Organization (FAO) on World Food Day, 16 October 2001 in an official ceremony in Rome, Italy. She has participated in numerous round-table discussions on the role of FAO ambassadors in helping the Organization combat world hunger. As FAO ambassador, Majida inaugurated the First Annual Agricultural Week in Lebanon and dedicated the book prepared by FAO Sanabel El Kheir on 8 November 2005 during an official ceremony to celebrate World Food Day 60th Anniversary at the UNESCO Palace in Beirut.

In her acceptance speech, Majida said: "While pursuing our dreams and hopes, we tend to forget the importance of our bones, and we end up wearing them out – we realize only when it is too late that we didn't take care of them. This is why I am participating in this campaign, to shed light on this truth, because if we are aware we can avoid this terrible disease and thereby avoid misery, sadness and a poor quality of life."

She was also chosen as an ambassador of the 'Alam Sagheer' (Small World) program, along with Titanic actor and producer Billy Zane, dedicated to education without borders. Majida said during a press conference that the event is evidence that humanity can unite for good and to make people's lives better anywhere in the world. She also thanked the organizers and hoped peace will spread all over the Arab world. The charity event was held under the patronage of Sheikh Nahyan bin Mubarak Al Nahyan, who described the festival as one that "celebrates human connections, international dialogue and strong support for the less fortunate of our fellow global citizens – values that are fundamental to our collective vision for the United Arab Emirates". The festival took place at Emirates Palace and expected to raise millions for underprivileged children across the globe. The Minister toured with Majida various booths of participating countries and they attended performances for each country including Lebanon.

In December 2012, Majida El Roumi visited the United Nations Economic and Social Commission for Western Asia (ESCWA) headquarters to follow up on the exacerbating problem of poverty in Beirut. El Roumi called for educating the youth since, "ignorance can only lead to poverty," as per her words. "Poverty is the cradle of wars, violence and corruption", she said, expressing hope that women would come to realize their true capacities and their equal worth to men. She also considered that art is a message that should be used for common good hoping that her message will prompt officials to tend to Lebanon's disadvantaged members of society.

In celebration of Bulgari's 130th anniversary, Majida El Roumi has been named the first Middle East Humanitarian Ambassador of the Bulgari – Save the Children Partnership in July 2014 and joins the likes of Naomi Watts, Dita Von Teese, Meg Ryan, Leighton Meester and so many others in the support of this worthy cause. The partnership between one of the industry's leading jewelry houses and the world's largest independent international organization running programs in developing and developed countries has generated over AED 98 million and benefited under-privileged children in 23 countries around the globe.  El Roumi is responsible for the overall direction, leadership, and coordination of Save the Children programs in Jordan as it was told in the press conference that took place at Al Bustan Hotel, Lebanon, in the presence of a crowd of Lebanese journalists and dignitaries. The renowned Italian photographer Fabrizio Ferri has actively supported this initiative with his time and talent. Over the years, he has photographed over 200 celebrities wearing the ring and the pendant in support of Bulgari's commitment to quality schooling for the world's neediest children including Majida, whose poster was officially launched during the press conference. Majida clearly stated during the press conference "I will strive to bring joy to my surroundings and to the people who are in need of it. Everything that's happening is a crime in every meaning of the word. I feel that I have a mission and my appointment is for a cause that I truly believe in. I will travel the extra mile and do what I can regardless of the size of my mission." She also added, "There is no financial rewards for my participation in this humanitarian effort, as financial things do not bring happiness."

Voice characteristics

Speeches 

During many cultural, social and political events, Majida El Roumi always chooses to deliver messages or was asked to give a speech for the occasion. Some of her marked speeches are listed below:
Ghazal'''s First Copy: In a passionate speech addressed to Lebanese, El-Roumi entreated her compatriots to join her in her mission of peace, rejecting wars and divisions in a special release ceremony for her album Ghazal. Majida chose to donate proceeds from her new album to student scholarships at AUB in 2012.
Bikaffe (It Is Enough): A strong speech at the memory of the well-known Journalist Gebran Tueni after 2 years from his assassination. This speech is dedicated to all Lebanese people, leaders and especially politicians in 2007.
Dialogue Between Generations: A speech Majida delivered in Jerash- Jordan about dialogue between generations in 2002.
Maha: A poem written by Majida mourning her sister Maha, during a special mass in Kfarshima in 2002.
Water: An article for Majida published in Lebanese newspapers on the International Water Day in 2002.
World's Peace: Majida's speech on the International Day of Peace in Beirut in 2002.
Telefood Day: An article for Majida published in Lebanese newspapers on the World Food Day in 2002.
FAO Ambassadress: Majida's speech for her designation as the honorable ambassadress of the Food and Agriculture Organization (FAO) in 2001.
Nizar Qabbani: A short message by Majida mourning the Arab poet Nizar Qabbani in 1998.
Red Cross: Majida's speech about Red Cross at a concert in Tripoli, Lebanon in 1996.
Rapture: Majida's opinion on ecstasy while singing in 1995.
Cedar's Medal: Majida's speech on the occasion of receiving Lebanese Medal of the Cedars from President Hraoui in 1994.
The Lebanese Song: A lecture Majida gave on the Lebanese song and music in 1992.
Halim El Roumi: Majida's speech on the occasion of commemorating her father, Halim El Roumi, in Kfarshima- Lebanon in 1991.

 Discography 

 Albums 

 Singles 
Since the 1970s, Majida always released singles, with some of them were not included in her albums. She also performed many Christmas carols in several recitals, and dedicated patriotic singles for countries she visited. Most well-known singles are listed below:

 Egyptian songs: remakes 

 Videography 

 Honors and titles 
 

: National Order of the work from the Presidency of the Republic of Tunisia in 1987.
: The Golden Cedar, 1988.
: Shield from the French National Assembly for 1993.
: National Shield of Honor of the Cedars, Knight's Order from the President of the Lebanese Republic, 1994.
: "Algerian citizenship" Certificate from the People's Democratic Republic of Algeria, 1997.
: The Médecins Sans Frontières Shield in 1999.
: Order of Merit from the Egyptian Journalists Syndicate, 2000.
A Certificate and a shield of Honor for FAO Ambassador, 2001.
: Honoring Shield from her Majesty Queen Noor of Jordan in 2002.
: The National Shield of Honor, Order of Merit of Officer's Grade from the Republic of Côte d'Ivoire, 2003.
: The Shield of Honour from the Syrian Ministry of Culture, 2004.
: Le Bouclier de l'information et de la culture'' / Algerian Shield of Culture and Information and The Gold Medal for the fiftieth anniversary of the outbreak of the liberation revolution, from the President of Republic of Algeria in 2005.
: Honorary member of the Students' Scholarship Association at the American University in Beirut, 2005.
: Honorary President of the Lebanese Association for the prevention of osteoporosis and The Universal framework of the joints and bone disease – the Lebanese branch, 2007.
: Honorary Doctorate in Humanities from the Board of Trustees of the American University in Beirut, (2009).
: Patent of Lebanese honor and gratitude by the Universal Association of Lebanese Worldwide – Belize and the actual recognition of her efforts in the service of Lebanon, humanity and Universal peace (2009).
: Honoring from the Catholic Church on the occasion of an encounter of Catholic priests in Lebanon (2010).
: The National Shield of Honour.
: The National Order of Cultural Merit from the Republic of Tunisia, 2010.
: The National Shield of Honor of the Cedars – Order of Commodore from the President of the Republic, 25 June 2011.
: Ordre des Arts et des Lettres – insigne d'Officier / Officer Grade, from the president of the Republic, 24 January 2013.
: The Golden Key of the city of Alexandria from the mayor Mr. Tarek Mahdi, 20 March 2014.
: Order of Civil Merit, 2017

References

External links 

1956 births
Living people
21st-century Lebanese women singers
Lebanese Melkite Greek Catholics
People from South Lebanon
Lebanese University alumni
Singers who perform in Classical Arabic
Lebanese people of Egyptian descent
Knights of the National Order of the Cedar
Performers of Christian music in Arabic
20th-century Lebanese women singers
Lebanese film actresses
Lebanese television actresses
People from Kfarshima
Universal Music Group artists